Thomas Süssli (born 24 September 1966) is a Swiss Lieutenant General. Since 1 January 2020, he has served as the Chief of the Armed Forces. He succeeded Philippe Rebord.

Süssli worked in the private sector in the banking and IT realms before becoming a full-time officer in 2015. In 2019, he was chosen to succeed Philippe Rebord as Chief of the Armed Forces, with his selection being viewed by observers as unusual considering his background. Rebord's formal retirement ceremony was held on 5 December 2019, and Süssli formally became the Armed Forces chief on January 1, 2020.

Decorations and awards

 
Source:

References

External links

Official profile page

1966 births
Living people
Swiss military officers